The Los Alamos Primer was a printed version of the first five lectures on the principles of nuclear weapons given to new arrivals at the top-secret Los Alamos laboratory during the Manhattan Project. They were originally given by the physicist Robert Serber after being delivered in person on April 5–14, 1943, based on conclusions reached at a conference held in July and September 1942 at the University of California, Berkeley by Robert Oppenheimer. The notes from the lecture which became the Primer were written by Edward Condon.

The first paragraph states the intention of the Los Alamos laboratory during World War II:
The object of the project is to produce a practical military weapon in the form of a bomb in which the energy is released by a fast neutron chain reaction in one or more of the materials known to show nuclear fission.

The Primer contained the basic physical principles of nuclear fission, as they were known at the time, and their implications for nuclear weapon design. It suggested a number of possible ways to assemble a critical mass of uranium-235 or plutonium, the most simple being the shooting of a "cylindrical plug" into a sphere of "active material" with a "tamper"—dense material which would reflect neutrons inward and keep the reacting mass together to increase its efficiency (this model, the Primer said, "avoids fancy shapes"). They also explored designs involving spheroids, a primitive form of "implosion" (suggested by Richard C. Tolman), and explored the speculative possibility of "autocatalytic methods" which would increase the efficiency of the bomb as it exploded.

The Primer became designated as the first official Los Alamos technical report (LA-1), and though its information about the physics of fission and weapon design was soon rendered obsolete, it is still considered a fundamental historical document in the history of nuclear weapons. Its contents would be of little use today to someone attempting to build a nuclear weapon, a fact acknowledged by its complete declassification in 1965. It used to be available for download from Los Alamos's website, but after the September 11 attacks, Los Alamos restricted access to all of their technical reports. It can still be found on internet mirrors, though, as well as on Wikipedia.

In 1992, an edited version of the Primer with many annotations and explanations by Serber was published with an introduction by Richard Rhodes.

See also
 Los Alamos Primer.pdf
 List of books about nuclear issues

References
Serber, Robert. The Los Alamos primer: the first lectures on how to build an atomic bomb, edited with an introduction by Richard Rhodes. Berkeley: University of California Press, 1992.

External links
The original Los Alamos Primer (LA-1) from a Federation of American Scientists mirror
A mirror of the FAS file at Wikimedia Commons
Review of the 1992 version of the Primer

Manhattan Project
Books about the Manhattan Project
1943 non-fiction books
Books of lectures
History of physics